is a Japanese rugby union player. He plays as a scrum-half.

Yatomi is currently a player for Yamaha Jubilo, from Iwata.

He has 15 caps for Japan, with 2 tries scored, 10 points in aggregate, since 2006. His debut was at a 50-14 win over South Korea, in Tokyo, in a 2007 Rugby World Cup qualifier, where he played as a substitute. He was present at the 2007 Rugby World Cup, playing two games.

References

External links

1985 births
Living people
Japanese rugby union players
Rugby union scrum-halves
Japan international rugby union players
Waseda University Rugby Football Club players
Sportspeople from Kyoto Prefecture
Shizuoka Blue Revs players
Sunwolves players